Eritrean Canadians are a hyphenated ethnicity of Canadians who are of full or partial Eritrean national origin, heritage and/or ancestry, Canadian citizens of Eritrean descent, or an Eritrea-born person who resides in Canada. According to the 2021 Canadian census, 36,290 Canadians reported Eritrean ancestry.

History
Eritreans began to arrive in Canada as refugees from the Eritrean War of Independence in the late 1970s. After Eritrea gained independence in 1991, Eritreans continued to flee from human rights violations committed by the Eritrean government.

Demographics
According to the 2011 Canadian Census, approximately 13,430 people reported Eritrean ancestry. This number increased to 25,255 by 2016 and further increased to 36,290 in 2021. However, accurate numbers of Eritrean refugees are difficult to estimate because many Eritreans who fled before Eritrea's independence had identified as or were considered Ethiopian.

Geographic distribution
The following table lists Canadian provinces by their Eritrean population.

Toronto
The largest group of Eritreans in Canada are located in Toronto. As of 2021, approximately 9,380 people of Eritrean descent live in the Toronto CMA. The Eritrean Canadian Community Centre and Eritrean Canadian Association of Ontario are located in Toronto.

Calgary
The second largest group of Eritreans in Canada are located in Calgary. As of 2021, approximately 5,395 people of Eritrean descent live in the Calgary CMA. The Eritrean Canadian Community Association of Calgary was founded in 1983.

Edmonton
As of 2021, approximately 4,605 people of Eritrean descent live in the Edmonton CMA.

Winnipeg
As of 2021, approximately 3,070 people of Eritrean descent live in the Winnipeg CMA.

Ottawa-Gatineau (National Capital Region)
As of 2021, approximately 2,095 people of Eritrean descent live in Ottawa, Ontario and 2,135 live in Ottawa-Gatineau.

Notable people
Shannon-Ogbani Abeda - Bobsledder, alpine skier.
Simon Bairu - Retired long-distance runner.
Grace Mahary - Model.
Amanuel Melles - community organizer.
SAFE - Rapper, singer, songwriter.

See also

Demographics of Eritrea
Religion in Eritrea
Eritrean Americans
Foreign relations of Eritrea
Habesha Peoples
Ethiopian Canadians
Ethiopian Americans

References

Eritrean diaspora
Ethnic groups in Canada
Eritrean expatriates in Canada
Eritrean emigrants to Canada
African Canadian